Hong Lok Road is an at-grade MTR Light Rail stop located at the junction of Castle Peak Road and Hong Lok Road in Yuen Long District. It began service on 18 September 1988 and belongs to Zone 5.

References

MTR Light Rail stops
Former Kowloon–Canton Railway stations
Yuen Long District
Railway stations in Hong Kong opened in 1988